Good Move! is the third album by American organist Freddie Roach recorded in 1963 and released on the Blue Note label.

Reception

The Allmusic review by Stephen Thomas Erlewine awarded the album 4 stars and stated "Laid-back and loosely swinging, Good Move captures organist Freddie Roach near the peak of his form. Roach never leans too heavily on his instrument, preferring a calmer, tasteful attack, yet he is never boring because he has a strong sense of groove".

Track listing
All compositions by Freddie Roach except where noted
 "It Ain't Necessarily So" (George Gershwin, Ira Gershwin) - 5:02
 "When Malindy Sings" (Oscar Brown Jr., Paul Laurence Dunbar) - 5:20
 "Pastel" (Erroll Garner) - 4:31
 "Wine, Wine, Wine" - 6:31
 "On Our Way Up" - 6:20
 "T'ain't What You Do (It's the Way That You Do It)" (Sy Oliver, Trummy Young) - 4:58
 "Lots of Lovely Love" (Richard Rodgers) - 4:59
 "I.Q. Blues" - 5:21

Recorded on November 29, 1963 (1, 3, 6 & 8) and December 9, 1963 (2, 4, 5 & 7).

Personnel
Freddie Roach - organ
Blue Mitchell - trumpet (tracks 2, 4, 5 & 7)
Hank Mobley - tenor saxophone (2, 4, 5 & 7)
Eddie Wright - guitar
Clarence Johnston - drums

References

Blue Note Records albums
Freddie Roach (organist) albums
1963 albums
Albums recorded at Van Gelder Studio
Albums produced by Alfred Lion